is a Prefectural Natural Park in central Hyōgo Prefecture, Japan. Established in 1965, the park centres upon Mount Kasagata and Mount Sen, and spans the municipalities of Ichikawa, Kamikawa, and Taka.

See also
 National Parks of Japan

References

Parks and gardens in Hyōgo Prefecture
Protected areas established in 1965
1965 establishments in Japan